"You Can Have It All" is a song by American singer George McCrae. It was written by Harry Wayne Casey and Richard Finch and released as a single in 1974, reaching number 23 on the UK Singles Chart.

The song was notably covered by American indie rock band Yo La Tengo and released as a single from their 2000 album And Then Nothing Turned Itself Inside-Out.

Yo La Tengo cover 

The song was covered by Yo La Tengo for their 2000 album And Then Nothing Turned Itself Inside-Out, and was released as a single, charting at number 87 on the UK Singles Chart. The artwork for the single featured a photograph of comedian Amy Poehler.

Reviewing the single, AllMusic wrote: "Yo La Tengo rework the song so thoroughly that it sounds like an original. [...] as a stylistic choice, it works beautifully, not least because when David Henry's cello line comes in towards the song's end, its unexpected beauty is all the sweeter because of the genial goofiness of the rest of the arrangement."

References 

George McCrae songs
1974 songs
1974 singles
2000 singles
Yo La Tengo songs
Songs written by Harry Wayne Casey
Songs written by Richard Finch (musician)